Cryptolechia prothyropa is a moth in the family Depressariidae. It was described by Edward Meyrick in 1938. It is found in China (Yunnan).

References

Moths described in 1938
Cryptolechia (moth)
Taxa named by Edward Meyrick